Rebecca Kenna ( Granger; born 11 January 1989) is an English professional snooker player from Keighley. She competes on the World Women's Snooker Tour, through which she also earned a tour card for the professional World Snooker Tour. She was runner-up in the 2018 World Ladies Billiards Championship.

Biography
Kenna started playing on the women's snooker circuit in 2016, and reached the semi-finals of the world championship at her first attempt. She ended her first full season ranked sixth, having reached the semi-finals of the world championship again, and recorded a victory over multiple world championship title holder Reanne Evans in the course of reaching the final of the 2017 Connie Gough Trophy.

In 2018, at her first billiards tournament, she reached the final of the World Women's Billiards Championship, losing 209–329 to Emma Bonney. This was Bonney's sixth consecutive world championship win, and her thirteenth overall.

Kenna was one of four players selected to take part in the Women's Tour Championship 2019, to be held at the Crucible Theatre in August 2019, the first women's matches to take place at the iconic snooker venue for 16 years.

She is co-owner of Cue Sports Yorkshire, which sells cues and accessories. She also works as a snooker coach, holding a Level 2 certificate in snooker coaching.

From the start of the 2022/23 snooker season, Kenna has a place on the professional snooker tour.

Performance and rankings timeline

World Snooker Tour

World Women's Snooker

Career finals

Women's snooker finals: 9 (4 titles)

Team snooker finals: 2

Billiards finals: 1

Personal life
Kenna was born Rebecca Granger. She is married to Ashley Kenna, who co-owns Cue Sports Yorkshire with her.

References

External links
Player Profile – Rebecca Kenna Women's World Snooker
Rebecca Kenna WPBSA Tournament Manager

1989 births
Living people
English snooker players
English players of English billiards
Female snooker players
Female players of English billiards
Sportspeople from Keighley